Bern-Mittelland District in the Canton of Bern was created on 1 January 2010. It is part of the Bern-Mittelland administrative region, and is the only district in the region.

It is made up of the valley of the rivers Aare and Emme, some of the foothills of the Bernese Alps, as well as the plain around the capital Bern, and has many small farms and hilly forested regions with small to mid-sized towns scattered throughout. It is perhaps best known by foreigners and visitors for the Emmental. The classic Swiss cheese with holes Emmentaler comes from this region's forests and pastures, of hilly and low mountainous countryside in the  range.

Municipalities

Mergers and name changes
On 1 January 2011 the former municipalities of Albligen and Wahlern merged to form the new municipality of Schwarzenburg.
 The municipality of Belpberg merged on 1 January 2012 into the municipality of Belp.
 On 1 January 2014 the former municipality of Bleiken bei Oberdiessbach merged into the municipality of Oberdiessbach. The former municipalities of Büren zum Hof, Etzelkofen, Grafenried, Limpach, Mülchi, Schalunen and Zauggenried merged into the municipality of Fraubrunnen, the former municipality of Münchringen and Scheunen merged into the municipality of Jegenstorf.
 The municipality of Tägertschi merged on 1 January 2017 into the municipality of Münsingen.
 On 1 January 2018 the former municipalities of Gelterfingen, Mühledorf and Noflen merged into the municipality of Kirchdorf.
 The municipality of Schlosswil merged on 1 January 2018 into the municipality of Grosshöchstetten.
 On 1 January 2019 the former municipality of Golaten merged into the municipality of Kallnach.
 On 1 January 2020 the former municipalities of Kirchenthurnen, Lohnstorf and Mühlethurnen merged into the new municipality of Thurnen.
 On 1 January 2021 the former municipality of Rümligen merged into Riggisberg.
 On 1 January 2022 the former municipality of Clavaleyres merged into Murten (Canton of Freiburg)
 On 1 January 2023 the former municipality of Diemerswil merged into Münchenbuchsee.

Demographics
, the population was 48.3% male and 51.7% female. The population was made up of 156,642 Swiss men (40.3% of the population) and 31,135 (8.0%) non-Swiss men. There were 172,829 Swiss women (44.5%) and 2,794 (0.7%) non-Swiss women.

Notes and references

External links

Districts of the canton of Bern